TGP may refer to:

 Taller de Gráfica Popular, an artist's print collective in Mexico
 Tencent Gaming Platform
 The Good Place, an American fantasy comedy series.
 The Gateway Pundit, an American far-right fake news website
 Thumbnail gallery post, an ad-driven website with thumbnail links
 Tokyo Ghetto Pussy, a German musical project by Rolf Ellmer and Markus Löffel
 Turned, ground, and polished, a finishing process for metal shafting
 Targeting pod, a device used by military aircraft for identifying targets and guiding precision-guided munitions such as laser-guided bombs to those targets